Look Here may refer to:

 "Look Here", a song by Mose Allison on the 1964 album The Word from Mose, covered by The Clash
 Look Here, an American television show of 1957–1958 hosted by Martin Agronsky
 Look Here (horse), a British Thoroughbred racehorse